IntelliCorp is a name used by multiple corporations:

IntelliCorp (Software), provider of SAP application lifecycle management software.
IntelliCorp (Employee Background Check), provider of employee background checks for employment and other purposes.